The 1978 New Mexico gubernatorial election took place on November 7, 1978, in order to elect the Governor of New Mexico. Due to term limits, incumbent Democrat Jerry Apodaca was ineligible to seek a second term as governor. Bruce King, a member of the Democratic Party won the open seat. With a margin of victory of just 1.09% this was the second closest contest of the 1978 Gubernatorial Cycle, behind only the election in Texas.

Democratic primary
The Democratic primary was won by former Governor Bruce King.

Results

Republican primary
The Republican primary was won by former state senator Joe Skeen.

Results

General election

Results

References

1978
gubernatorial
New Mexico
November 1978 events in the United States